Hudson's Hope Airport  is located  west northwest of Hudson's Hope, British Columbia, Canada.

References

Registered aerodromes in British Columbia
Peace River Regional District